Electrophaes is a genus of geometer moths in the Larentiinae subfamily.

Species

Electrophaes aggrediens Prout, 1940
Electrophaes albipunctaria (Leech, 1897)
Electrophaes aliena (Butler, 1880)
Electrophaes aliena mesodonta Prout, 1940
Electrophaes aspretifera (Prout, 1938)
Electrophaes chimakaleparia (Oberthür, 1893)
Electrophaes chrysophaës (Prout, 1923)
Electrophaes corylata – broken-barred carpet (Thunberg, 1792)
Electrophaes cryopetra Prout, 1940
Electrophaes cyria Prout, 1940
Electrophaes ephoria Prout, 1940
Electrophaes euryleuca Prout, 1940
Electrophaes fulgidaria (Leech, 1897)
Electrophaes fulgidaria chrysodeta Prout, 1928
Electrophaes intertexta (Warren, 1893)
Electrophaes moltrechti Prout, 1940
Electrophaes nigrifulvaria (Hampson, 1902)
Electrophaes niveonotata (Warren, 1901)
Electrophaes niveopicta (Warren, 1893)
Electrophaes perpulchra (Butler, 1886)
Electrophaes recens (Inoue, 1982)
Electrophaes rhacophora (Prout, 1938)
Electrophaes subochraria (Leech, 1897)
Electrophaes taiwana Inoue, 1986
Electrophaes tsermosaria (Oberthür, 1893)
Electrophaes westi (Prout, 1931)
Electrophaes zaphenges Prout, 1940

References
 Electrophaes at Markku Savela's Lepidoptera and Some Other Life Forms

Cidariini
Taxa named by Louis Beethoven Prout